Janie is a feminine given name, often a diminutive form of the Jane, and a nickname. It may refer to:

People
 Janie Porter Barrett (1865–1948), American social reformer, educator and welfare worker
 Janie Bradford (born 1939), American songwriter
 Katherine Jane Bryant (born 1974), American television costume designer known professionally as Janie Bryant
 Janie Dee (born 1962), English actress and singer
 Janie Finlay, Australian politician
 Janie Fricke (born 1947), American country music singer
 Janie Lou Gibbs (1932–2010), American serial killer
 Janie Jones, stage name of English singer Marion Mitchell (born 1941)
 Janie Marèse (1908–1931), French film actress born Jeanne Marie Thérèse Bugnot
 Jane Janie Sell (born 1941), American actress
 Janie Taylor, American ballet dancer, former New York City Ballet principal dancer
 Janie Shores (born 1932), American retired judge, first woman judge on the Supreme Court of Alabama
 Janie Tienphosuwan (born 1981), Thai actress and model
 Janie Tsao (born Wu Chien in 1953), Taiwanese-born American entrepreneur and hardware engineer, co-founder of Linksys
 Elizabeth Jane Janie Wagstaff (born 1974), American former swimmer
 Janie Ward-Engelking (fl. 2012–present), American politician

Fictional characters
 Janie Johnson, the protagonist of the Janie Johnson series of young adult novels
 Janie Mae Crawford, the protagonist of Their Eyes Were Watching God

See also
 
Jean (disambiguation)
Jeannie (disambiguation)
Jeanine

References 

English feminine given names
Hypocorisms